Weiler's gecko (Urocotyledon weileri) is a species of lizard in the family Gekkonidae. The species is endemic to Cameroon.

Etymology
The specific name, weileri, is in honor of Justus Weiler who collected the holotype in Cameroon.

Habitat
The natural habitat of U. weileri is forest.

Reproduction
U. weileri is oviparous.

References

Further reading
Chirio, Laurent; LeBreton, Matthew (2007). Atlas des reptiles du Cameroun. Paris: Muséum nationale d'histoire naturelle. 688 pp. . (in French).
Kluge AG (1983). "Cladistic Relationships among Gekkonid Lizards". Copeia 1983 (2): 465–475. (Urocotyledon weileri, new combination).
Müller L (1909). "Vorläufige Mitteilung über ein neues Chamäleon und ein neuen Gecko aus Kamerun ". Jahrbücher des Nassauischen Vereins für Naturkunde 62: 111–115. (Diplodactylus weileri, new species, pp. 113–115). (in German).
Rösler H (2000). "Kommentierte Liste der rezent, subrezent und fossil bekannten Geckotaxa (Reptilia: Gekkonomorpha)". Gekkota 2: 28–153. (Urocotyledon weileri, p. 119). (in German).

Urocotyledon
Geckos of Africa
Reptiles of Cameroon
Endemic fauna of Cameroon
Reptiles described in 1909